Betty to the Rescue is a 1917 American comedy silent film directed by Frank Reicher and written by Beatrice DeMille and Leighton Osmun. The film stars Fannie Ward, Jack Dean, Lillian Leighton, James Neill, Charles West and Taylor N. Duncan. The film was released on January 15, 1917, by Paramount Pictures.

Plot
Nobody tells Betty that the inherited gold mine is worth nothing. Entrusted to John Kenwood and his mother after her father's death, the girl also ignores that the costs of her maintenance for a luxurious school are borne by Kenwood himself. Who refuses — for sentimental reasons — to sell the mine to a certain Fleming, an engineer who tries to get his hands on it because he has found a rich vein of gold. When Kenwood loses his oranges crop to the frost, resulting in ruin, Betty discovers the guardian's generosity and feels indebted to him. She will be able to repay him because she too will find the gold vein, realizing, at the same time, that she loves John.

Cast 
Fannie Ward as Betty Sherwin
Jack Dean as John Kenwood
Lillian Leighton as Constance Kenwood
James Neill as Henry Sherwin
Charles West as Fleming
Taylor N. Duncan as Big Jim

References

External links 
 

1917 films
1910s English-language films
Silent American comedy films
1917 comedy films
Paramount Pictures films
American black-and-white films
American silent feature films
Films directed by Frank Reicher
1910s American films